F+W, (formerly F+W Publications and F+W Media), was a media and e-commerce company headquartered in New York City.
Founded in 1913, F+W published magazines, books, digital products (including e-books and e-magazines), produced online video, offered online education, and owned and operated e-stores, as well as consumer and trade shows.

History
F+W was named after two of its early publications: Farm Quarterly and Writer's Digest. The company grew though a series of acquisitions, including book publisher David & Charles, Krause Publications in 2002, Horticulture magazine, and Adams Media in 2003. The private equity firm ABRY Partners purchased F+W in 2005. In August 2012 F+W Media acquired Interweave, an arts and crafts media company based in Loveland, Colorado. In 2014, F+W Media acquired New Track Media, renamed itself F+W, and was acquired by the private equity company Tinicum.

In 2008, the company began to focus more on e-commerce activities and offering products and services related to the content of its magazines. The e-commerce business grew from one store with $6 million in revenue in 2008 to 31 e-commerce stores with more than $65 million for 2015. 
In May 2017, some creditors received a 97% stake in the company in exchange for debt relief and a new line of credit.

Demise
In January 2018, with the CEO and two other top executives leaving the company, F+W slashed its workforce by 40%.

F+W filed for Chapter 11 bankruptcy protection on March 10, 2019. The book publishing assets of the company were won by Penguin Random House at a bankruptcy auction in June 2019. The grouping of the assets drew criticism. Several properties including Sky & Telescope were sold individually.

Overview 
F+W Media was a special interest content provider and marketer of enthusiast magazines, books, conferences, trade shows, and interactive media properties.

F+W's special-interest categories included art, crafts, mixed media, writing, genealogy, antiques and collectibles, graphic design, hunting. In 2011 the Company entered the fiction market with the acquisition of Tyrus Books. In 2012, the company launched imprints in romance (Crimson Romance) and young adult fiction (Merit Press).

Publications were organized around some 20 community-based units, each of which focuses on a particular special interest category. The company also published about 600 new book titles annually, and had a library of some 4000 titles.

Its brands were David & Charles, Impact Books, Krause Publications, North Light Books, Writer's Digest and Interweave Press.

Situation after dissolution 
In June 2019 the assets of F+W were sold at bankruptcy auctions.

Various assets of F+W were sold prior to the bankruptcy filing.

References

External links
 

Defunct publishing companies of the United States
Defunct companies based in New York City
Companies that filed for Chapter 11 bankruptcy in 2019
Publishing companies established in 1913
American companies established in 1913
1913 establishments in Ohio
2019 disestablishments in Ohio
American companies disestablished in 2019